The 2016 Mole Valley District Council election took place on 5 May 2016 to elect members of Mole Valley District Council in England. This was on the same day as other local elections.

References

2016 English local elections
2016
2010s in Surrey